Xavier Beulin (19 December 1958 – 19 February 2017) was a French agribusiness executive and lobbyist. He was the chairman of the Avril Group from 2000 to 2017, and chairman of the Fédération nationale des syndicats d'exploitants agricoles from 2010 to 2017.

References

1958 births
2017 deaths
French businesspeople